Leonard C. Fairley (born January 2, 1951) is a former American football cornerback who played one season with the Houston Oilers of the National Football League (NFL). He was drafted by the Oilers in the seventh round of the 1974 NFL Draft. He played college football at Alcorn Agricultural and Mechanical College and attended M. F. Nichols High School in Biloxi, Mississippi. Fairley was also a member of the Buffalo Bills.

College career
Fairley played strong safety for the Alcorn A&M Braves. He was inducted into the Alcorn State Sports Hall of Fame in 2010.

Professional career
Fairley was selected by the Houston Oilers with the 157th pick in the 1974 NFL Draft. He played in two games for the Oilers during the 1974 season. He was later released by the Oilers. Fairley signed with the Buffalo Bills on October 1, 1974.

References

External links
Just Sports Stats

Living people
1951 births
Players of American football from Mississippi
American football defensive backs
Alcorn State Braves football players
Houston Oilers players
Sportspeople from Biloxi, Mississippi